The Vampire Diaries, an American supernatural drama, was renewed for a fifth season by The CW on February 11, 2013. The fifth season premiered on October 3, 2013, followed by the series premiere of the spin-off series The Originals.

Cast

Main

Nina Dobrev as Elena Gilbert / Katherine Pierce / Amara
Paul Wesley as Stefan Salvatore / Silas / Tom Avery
Ian Somerhalder as Damon Salvatore
Steven R. McQueen as Jeremy Gilbert 
Kat Graham as Bonnie Bennett
Candice Accola as Caroline Forbes
Zach Roerig as Matt Donovan / Gregor
Michael Trevino as Tyler Lockwood / Julian

Recurring

Olga Fonda as Nadia Petrova
Rick Cosnett as Wes Maxfield
Michael Malarkey as Enzo St. John
Shaun Sipos as Aaron Whitmore
Penelope Mitchell as Liv Parker
Chris Brochu as Luke Parker
Marguerite MacIntyre as Liz Forbes
Kendrick Sampson as Jesse
Janina Gavankar as Qetsiyah/Tessa
Caitlin McHugh as Sloan
Raffi Barsoumian as Markos

Special guest
Jasmine Guy as Sheila Bennett

Special appearance

David Anders as John Gilbert
Sara Canning as Jenna Sommers
Daniel Gillies as Elijah Mikaelson
Bianca Lawson as Emily Bennett
Joseph Morgan as Klaus Mikaelson

Guest

Rick Worthy as Rudy Hopkins
Matt Davis as Alaric Saltzman
Kayla Ewell as Vicki Donovan
Claire Holt as Rebekah Mikaelson
Jason MacDonald as Grayson Gilbert
Hayley Kiyoko as Megan King 
Nathaniel Buzolic as Kol Mikaelson
Heather Hemmens as Maggie James
Arielle Kebbel as Lexi Branson

Episodes

Production

Development
The series was renewed for a fifth season on February 11, 2013. The first writers meeting held on April 15, 2013. Filming began on July 10, 2013, and finished on April 10, 2014.

Casting
Within the first three episodes, four new characters were introduced: Nadia, a girl with a mission of revenge who has traveled around the world, Jesse, an upper-class boy who goes to college, Actors Olga Fonda and Kendrick Sampson were cast in the roles of Nadia and Jesse, respectively. On August 2, 2013, it was announced that Janina Gavankar would play Tessa.

Reception

Critical response
Based on 13 reviews, the fifth season holds a 100% on Rotten Tomatoes with an average rating of 8.56 out of 10. The site's critics' consensus reads, "After a floundering fourth season, Vampire Diaries redeems itself with scorching twists that remind viewers that nothing is sacred."

Ratings

References

External links 
 

5
2013 American television seasons
2014 American television seasons